Yan Feng  (born February 7, 1982, in Dalian, Liaoning) is a Chinese international footballer.

Club career

Sichuan Guancheng
Yan Feng would play for top tier club Sichuan Guancheng in the 2003 Chinese Jia-A League. In the re-branded 2004 Chinese Super League he would make his debut in the new league against Beijing Guoan on May 16, 2004, to in a 1-1 draw. He would gradually established himself as their first choice defensive midfielder within their team until Sichuan Guancheng were disbanded at the end of the 2005 league season and he was free to leave the club.

Changchun Yatai
Being a young and experienced top tier player Yan Feng would attract the interests of several teams within China, eventually deciding to join the newly promoted Changchun Yatai at the beginning of the 2006 Chinese Super League season. He was the make his league debut in Changchun Yatai's first game of the season against Shanghai Shenhua on March 12 in a 0-0 draw. Throughout the season Changchun Yatai surprised many when they eventually finished the season in 4th. When Gao Hongbo was brought in to manage the squad Changchun Yatai were able to improve upon their previous season by actually winning the Chinese Super League 2007 title, with Yan Feng playing an integral part within the midfield.

International career
Yan Feng was called up into the Chinese senior team on the 25th of July, 2009 to face Kyrgyzstan in a friendly, which China won 3-0. Under the Chinese Head coach Gao Hongbo, Yan Feng would become a squad regular within the team and make a further appearance in another friendly against Kuwait on November 8, 2009, in a game that ended 2-2.

Career statistics
Statistics accurate as of match played 31 December 2019.

Honours

Club
Changchun Yatai
Chinese Super League: 2007

Country
 East Asian Football Championship: 2010

References

External links

Player stats at Sports.sohu.com

1982 births
Living people
Chinese footballers
Footballers from Dalian
China international footballers
Chinese Super League players
China League One players
China League Two players
Sichuan Guancheng players
Changchun Yatai F.C. players
Dalian Shide F.C. players
Dalian Professional F.C. players
Shaanxi Chang'an Athletic F.C. players
Association football midfielders